"Walkin' Back to Happiness" is a 1961 single by Helen Shapiro. The song was written by John Schroeder and Mike Hawker. With backing orchestrations by Norrie Paramor, the song was released in the United Kingdom on the Columbia (EMI) label on 29 September 1961. It was number one in the UK for three weeks beginning 19 October, but only reached #100 on the US Billboard Hot 100, Shapiro's only US chart appearance. The single sold over a million copies and earned Helen Shapiro a golden disc.

International chart positions

Cover Versions 
A cover version in Czech by Marta Kubišová, "S nebývalou ochotou", can be found on YouTube.

References

1961 singles
Helen Shapiro songs
Songs written by John Schroeder (musician)
1961 songs
Columbia Graphophone Company singles
Capitol Records singles
Songs written by Mike Hawker (songwriter)
Song recordings produced by Norrie Paramor
Irish Singles Chart number-one singles
Number-one singles in Israel
Number-one singles in New Zealand
Number-one singles in South Africa
UK Singles Chart number-one singles